The Black Ball Line (originally known as the Wright, Thompson, Marshall, & Thompson Line, then as the Old Line) was a passenger line founded by a group of New York Quaker merchants headed by Jeremiah Thompson, and included Isaac Wright & Son (William), Francis Thompson and Benjamin Marshall. All were Quakers except Marshall.

The line initially consisted of four packet ships, the Amity, Courier, Pacific and the James Monroe. All of these were running between Liverpool, England and New York City. This first scheduled trans-Atlantic service was founded in 1817.  In operation for some 60 years, it took its name from its flag, a black ball on a red background.

History

The Wright, Thompson, Marshall, & Thompson Line was founded in 1817 and began shipping operations in 1818. At some point in the line's history it became known as the Old Line and eventually became known as the Black Ball Line after the 1840s. The Black Ball Line established the modern era of liners. The packet ships were contracted by governments to carry mail and also carried passengers and timely items such as newspapers. Up to this point there were no regular passages advertised by sailing ships. They arrived at port when they could, dependent on the wind, and left when they were loaded, frequently visiting other ports to complete their cargo. The Black Ball Line undertook to leave New York on a fixed day of the month irrespective of cargo or passengers. The service took several years to establish itself and it was not until 1822 that the line increased sailings to two per month; it also reduced the cost of passage to 35 guineas.

The sensation this created brought in competitors such as the Red Star Line, which also adopted fixed dates. The average passage of packets from New York to Liverpool was 23 days eastward and 40 days westward. But this was at a period where usual reported passages were 30 and 45 days respectively, while westward passages of 65 to 90 days excited no attention. The best passage from New York to Liverpool in those days was the 15 days 16 hours achieved at the end of 1823 by the ship New York (though often incorrectly reported as Canada).  The westward crossing had a remarkable record of 15 days 23 hours set by the Black Ball's Columbia in 1830, during an unusually prolonged spell of easterly weather which saw several other packet ships making the journey in 16 to 17 days. Captain Joseph Delano was reported to be "up with the Banks of Newfoundland in ten days".

In 1836 the Line passed into the hands of Captain Charles H. Marshall, he gradually added the Columbus, Oxford. Cambridge, New York, England, Yorkshire, Fidelia, Isaac Wright, Isaac Webb, the third Manhattan, Montezuma, Alexander Marshall, Great Western, and Harvest Queen to the fleet.

The Black Ball Line is mentioned in several sea shanties, such as "Blow the Man Down," "Homeward Bound", "Eliza Lee", "New York Girls", and "Hurrah for the Black Ball Line."

List of Black Ball Line (USA) ships

Similar shipping lines
In 1851 James Baines & Co. of Liverpool entered the packet trade using the same name and flag as the New York company, despite its protests. Thus, for about twenty years, two "Black Ball lines" under separate ownership were operating in direct competition on the transatlantic packet trade. James Baines & Co. also operated ships running between Liverpool and Australia, including famous clipper ships such as Champion of the Seas, James Baines, Lightning, Indian Queen, Marco Polo and Sovereign of the Seas.
The Saint John-Liverpool Packet Line which existed for a couple of years in the 1850s was also known as the Black Ball Line. It was managed by Richard Wright, St. John, and William and James Fernie, in Liverpool.

Notes

References

External links
 
A Tribute To A Dynasty: The Black Ball Line and The Pacific Northwest
Transatlantic WNYC Reading Room
 Steamship Ticket for Passage of Mr. Nicholas Fish on the Packet Ship Yorkshire, 1859 at GG Archives

Transatlantic shipping companies
Transport companies established in 1817
Packet (sea transport)
Defunct shipping companies of the United Kingdom
Defunct shipping companies of the United States
Companies with year of disestablishment missing
Historic transport in Merseyside